Komárany is a village and municipality in Vranov nad Topľou District in the Prešov Region of eastern Slovakia.

History
In historical records the village was first mentioned in 1303.

Geography
The municipality lies at an altitude of 135 metres and covers an area of 4.752 km². It has a population of about 497 people.

Genealogical resources
The records for genealogical research are available at the state archive "Statny Archiv in Presov, Slovakia"
 Roman Catholic church records (births/marriages/deaths): 1769-1910 (parish B)
 Greek Catholic church records (births/marriages/deaths): 1787-1901 (parish B)
 Lutheran church records (births/marriages/deaths): 1830-1902 (parish B)

See also
 List of municipalities and towns in Slovakia

References

External links
 
Surnames of living people in Komarany

Villages and municipalities in Vranov nad Topľou District
Zemplín (region)